How to Be a ... Zillionaire! is the third studio album by English pop band ABC. It was originally released in October 1985, on the labels Neutron, Mercury and Vertigo. The album peaked at No. 28 on the UK Albums Chart and at No. 30 on the Billboard 200. Four singles were released from the album, "(How to Be A) Millionaire" (UK Singles Chart: No. 49; Billboard Hot 100: No. 20), "Be Near Me" (UK: No. 26; US: No. 9), "Vanity Kills" (UK: No. 74; US: No. 91), and the fourth was "Ocean Blue", (UK: No. 54). It is the group's first and only album to feature founder members Martin Fry and Mark White flanked by new members Eden and David Yarritu, the latter two credited merely as "performers" with effectively no or limited musical contribution to the album. The four-piece was also presented in a cartoon form for the album's artwork and promotional videos, and wore outrageous costumes and played false instruments for "live" promotional performances.

In 2005, a digitally remastered CD of the album was released with eight bonus tracks.

Track listing

Personnel 

ABC
 Martin Fry – lead and backing vocals
 Mark White – synthesizers, Yamaha DX7, E-mu Emulator II, Fairlight CMI programming
 Fiona Russell Powell (aka Eden) – vocals, record scratching
 David Yarritu – spoken voice

Additional personnel
 Gary Moberley – Fairlight CMI programming
 Don Snow – acoustic piano, synthesizers
 Skip McDonald – guitars on "Tower of London"
 David Williams – guitars on "(How to Be a) Millionaire"
 Brad Lang – bass guitar
 Keith LeBlanc – drums, rhythm beatbox programming 
 David Palmer – hi-hat
 Chris Whitten – additional drums on "15 Storey Halo"
 Guy Barker – trumpet on "Vanity Kills"
 Alan Carvell – backing vocals
 Jackie Challenor – backing vocals
 Lorenza Johnson – backing vocals
Mae McKenna - backing vocals
 P. P. Arnold – tertiary backing vocals on "Ocean Blue"

Production
 Mark White – producer
 Martin Fry – producer 
 Martyn Webster – chief engineer
 Julian Mendelsohn – mixing, second engineer
 Paul Corkett – assistant engineer
 Mike Drake – assistant engineer
 Charles Harrowell – assistant engineer
 Heff Moraes – assistant engineer
 Dietmar Schillinger – assistant engineer
 Mark Stent – assistant engineer
 Paul Wright – assistant engineer
 Ian Cooper – analogue mastering engineer
 Daryl Easlea – digital pre-mastering, album sequencing
 Gary Moore – digital mastering engineer
 Nick Knight – photography
 Keith Breeden at Design KB – art direction
 Alan Best – animation art
 Ted Hall – animation art
 Peter Care – dialogue and photo modelling director

Charts

Weekly charts

Year-end charts

References

External links

Album page from official ABC site

1985 albums
ABC (band) albums
Mercury Records albums
Vertigo Records albums